The Ceratostomataceae are a family of fungi in the phylum Ascomycota, class Sordariomycetes, subclass Hypocreomycetidae and order Coronophorales.

Species in the family have a widespread distribution, and are found growing on other fungi, on soil, or on rotting vegetation. The family may not be monophyletic as currently defined.

Genera 
As accepted by Wijayawardene et al. 2020;
 Arxiomyces  (3 species)
 Dactylidispora  (3)
 Echinusitheca  (1)
 Erythrocarpon  (1)
 Gonatobotrys  (ca. 10)

 Harzia  (10)
 Melanospora {{Au|Corda (69)
 Microthecium  (ca. 20) (formerly Pteridiosperma  
 Neotrotteria  (1)

 Pseudomicrothecium  (1)
 Pustulipora  (1)
 Rhytidospora  (5)
 Scopinella  (9)
 Setiferotheca  (1)

 Syspastospora  (4)
 Vittatispora  (1)

References 

Melanosporales
Ascomycota families